Aufseßplatz station is a Nuremberg U-Bahn station, located on the U1 line.

An unused tunnel stub for a connection curve exists south of the station on the side of the north-bound track. This curve was meant as connection to another subway line from Plärrer to Dutzendteich, which never got beyond an early planning stage. Like Plärrer, Hauptbahnhof and the much later Friedrich Ebert Platz orange tiles were used to indicate a possible interchange station. However, as of 2022 only Plärrer and Hauptbahnhof actually are interchange stations between different subway mainlines. While Aufseßplatz is also served by Tram line 5, this is a distinction three other stations (Rathenauplatz station, Frankenstraße station, Wöhrder Wiese station) share in addition to all four "orange tiled" ones.

References

Nuremberg U-Bahn stations
Railway stations in Germany opened in 1975
1975 establishments in West Germany